Euthalia nais, the baronet, is a species of Nymphalid butterfly found in South Asia.

Description

The male and the female both have tawny-yellow uppersides. The forewing has a traverse black line below apex cell and an oval spot beyond encircling a small yellow spot, a broad short oblique discal bar and an angulated postdiscal lunular band the costa narrowly and the termen shaded with black. Hindwing: a comparatively large triangular patch below the middle of the costa, a postdiscal evenly curved series of spots and a broad band along the termen black. Underside dark ochraceous red. Forewing: the base shaded with fuscous black, two spots at base of cell and a transverse line beyond crimson pink, edged with black: a very broad oblique discal band, angulated downwards below vein 4, bordered posteriorly by a large black spot on the inner side and outwardly and anteriorly by an oblique broad black band, followed by four anterior obliquely placed ochraceous-white spots, and beyond by a very narrow lunular black band bent downwards below vein 6. Hindwing: a crimson short line at extreme base, two crimson black-bordered spots in cell: a comparatively broad transverse discal white band often broken up into a large spot below middle of costa, with two or three spots in line below it; finally, a postdiscal series of small black spots. Antennae are black, bright ochraceous at apex; head, thorax and abdomen tawny red above, brown shaded with crimson-pink below.

Distribution
It is widely found in India and Sri Lanka. In India its distribution ranges from lower Himalayas to southern India

Life cycle

Larva
The larva is light green with the purple spots on the dorsal. The sides of the larva contain row of ten horizontal spines covered with fine green hair.

Pupa
The pupa is short broad and triangular. It is green and has gold spots and lines.

Larval host plants 
The larval host plants are Shorea robusta and Diospyros melanoxylon

See also
List of butterflies of India (Nymphalidae)

References

N
Butterflies of Asia
Butterflies described in 1771
Taxa named by Johann Reinhold Forster